Right-wing nationalism may refer to:

 National conservatism
 Right-wing populism